The qualification for the 2015 Boys' Youth European Volleyball Championship will be held from January 8–11, 2015. 31 teams are split into eight groups of 3 or 4 teams.  The group winners and the three best second placed teams will qualify for the 2015 Boys' Youth European Volleyball Championship in Ankara, Turkey.

Competing nations

Pool A
The mini-tournament will be hosted in Russia.

|}

|}

Pool B
The mini-tournament will be hosted in France.

|}

|}

Pool C
The mini-tournament will be hosted in Serbia.

|}

|}

Pool D
The mini-tournament will be hosted in Slovakia.

|}

|}

Pool E
The mini-tournament will be hosted in Germany.

|}

|}

Pool F
The mini-tournament will be hosted in Bulgaria.

|}

|}

Pool G
The mini-tournament will be hosted in Croatia.

|}

|}

Pool H
The mini-tournament will be hosted in Greece.

|}

|}

References

European Boys' Youth Championship Qualification
Boys' Youth European Volleyball Championship